Rahsaan is a given name. Notable people with the name include:

Rahsaan Bahati (born 1982), American racing cyclist who currently rides for his own cycling team, Bahati Foundation Elite Team
Rahsaan Roland Kirk (1935–1977), American jazz multi-instrumentalist who played tenor saxophone, flute, and many other instruments
Rahsaan Noor (born 1986), American film actor and filmmaker of Bengali descent
Rahsaan Patterson, American singer and actor, best known for portraying "The Kid" on the 1980s television show Kids Incorporated
Rahsaan Smith (born 1973), American professional basketball player
Aaron Rahsaan Thomas, TV and film screenwriter and producer, adjunct professor at the University of Southern California School of Cinematic Arts

See also
Rahsaan Rahsaan, live album by jazz multi-instrumentalist Rahsaan Roland Kirk
Rasan (disambiguation)